The USA Tax Act, short for "Unlimited Savings Allowance", was a bill in the United States Congress for changing tax laws to replace the federal income taxes with a progressive consumption tax on households and a value-added tax on businesses
. Lawrence Lokken credits Irving Fisher
with the insight that consumption can be taxed by taxing income minus savings. 
See also a later version of Lokken's book.  The first bill was introduced in the United States Senate in April 1995 by senators Sam Nunn (D-Ga.)
and Pete Domenici (R-N.M.).

References

Tax reform in the United States
United States proposed federal taxation legislation
1995 in economics
April 1995 events in the United States
Acts of the 104th United States Congress